The eleventh season of the Oxygen reality television series Bad Girls Club is titled Bad Girls Club: Miami and premiered on August 13, 2013. This is the second season to take place in Miami, the first being season 5, and was filmed in early 2013.

Cast

Original Bad Girls

Replacement Bad Girls

Duration of Cast

Episodes

Notes

References

External links

2013 American television seasons
Bad Girls Club seasons
Television shows set in Miami